State route 141 (SR-141) is a state highway in the U.S. state of Utah. Spanning , it connects U.S. Route 6 in Genola with Utah State Route 147 west of Payson in Utah County.

Route description
State Route 141 begins as State Street at US-6 on the south side of Genola, a small town in Utah County. From there, it travels northeast through eastern Genola, turning into Mountain Road as it leaves town and passes the Keigley quarry.

History

Major intersections

References

External links

 

141
 141